Kolindsund (the Sound of Kolind) is a   elongated drained lake on the peninsula Djursland in Denmark, extending  west, inland from the seaport Grenå by the Kattegat sea. Today the area is rich farmland kept dry by means of two pumping stations. At each station a 240-horsepower pump is turned on as needed, regulated by the water level in the canals that feed water to the pumps.

Pumping the lake dry started in May 1874. To this end a consortium built an infrastructure of drainage canals and two steam and wind powered pumping stations. Today the electric main pumping stations are located in the villages Fannerup and Enslev. Here water from the sound is pumped  up into the North Canal. From the North Canal the water runs into the Kattegat Sea by the seaport Grenå. At Kolind the level of the canals is a bit more than one meter above sea level. The North and South Canal cut off streams that would otherwise run into the former lake.

The fertile clay-like soil in the sound consists mainly of two types of aquatic deposits, marine and freshwater silt. Throughout all of the sound there is a mesh of drainage pipes that drain water into the middle canals ending at the two pumping stations.

During the Stone Ages after the last ice age 12,000 years ago, Kolindsund was a saltwater sound that cut off the northern part of the peninsula Djursland into an island. Sea level changes and/or land rise combined with wind-based sand drift blocked the entrance to the sea by Grenå and turned the navigable sound into a lake in the Middle Ages.

Today there is concern that possible future rising sea levels due to climate change might make it more difficult to keep the former lake dry as farmland.

History
The pumping stations were powered by steam engines and windmills until the 1930s. A shareholder-based company stood behind the lake drainage project as well as farming the former lake bottom in the first decades.

From the start it had only been planned to pump dry the western part of the lake, but as it turned out the shareholder-based company did not succeed in building a dam across the lake to isolate the western part from the eastern part. It is said that when attempting to build an  dam cutting the lake in two by the village Fannerup, the dam material loaded onto the lake bottom simply disappeared in the mud.  For this reason, the project was changed to pumping out the whole lake.

In 1921 Kolindsund, including the farms with large characteristic storage barns that had been built by the shareholder company, was sold to private owners. In the first decades after drainage, Kolindsund was not particularly good business for the shareholders.  In the late 1920s the infrastructure of pumps and canals was in need of repair and renewal. Combined with an economic crisis for farming in general, these factors jeopardized the continued pumping of water from the sound. The Danish Parliament, Folketinget, intervened in order to secure Kolindsund as farmland, and on 2 May 1932 a set of laws and loans was implemented aiming at continuing the pumping to keep Kolindsund as farmland. As part of the same deal, the unionized workers' rights in the labor-intensive farming of Kolindsund were officially recognized.  The Pumpelaug, a landowners' association that still exists, was delegated the task of managing the pump and canal infrastructure by the Folketing. Between 1935 and 1938 the steam- and wind-driven pumping stations were replaced by two electrically driven pumping stations still used today.  With the renovation in 1935–1938 the water level was lowered further in Kolindsund, just as dams between the cut-off canals and the former lake were strengthened.

Pumping
During project planning prior to drainage of the lake in the 1870s, the amount of water that had to be pumped out to keep the lake dry was erroneously calculated to be less than half the actual pumping needed. The figure was based on the calculated influx from rainfall over the given area.  In reality groundwater from the surrounding hills has a tendency to run under the cut-off canals and into the former lake, often surfacing as wellsprings that formed bogs, causing problems for farming. This extra amount of water meant that the pumping capacity was insufficient in the first decades after drainage of the lake. Here large parts of the sound were marshy fields only suitable for grazing in summer, but too wet for plowing and growing of more intensive grain-based crops.  With electrification and thus more efficient electric pumps and the lowered water table implemented in the late 1930s, these problems were solved, making Kolindsund into high-yield and stable farmland, which is still the case today.

Farming
Farming in Kolindsund does not require expensive and energy consuming irrigation even in the driest of summers. Irrigation is otherwise widespread when farming in Denmark. On the other hand, extra energy must be used to keep the two 240-horsepower electric pumps running a lot of the time. The high yields of Kolindsund are in part based on the nutrient-rich silt-based soil, deposited through millennia at the bottom of the former lake and sound in layers that are up to 20 meters thick. The soil is free of stones and rocks. In some places the fields are colored with white streaks of prehistoric banks of oyster and mussel shell that have been ploughed up, giving witness to the marine past of Kolindsund.  A similar type of drained sound and lake farmland in Denmark with mussel-rich soil can be seen in the Lammefjord located on the northern part of Denmark's largest island, Zealand. Lammefjorden was also pumped dry in the 1870s. Here vegetables, not least carrots, are established crops.  This is not the case in Kolindsund, even though the potential might be there due to the same types of soil. The crops in Kolindsund are purely grain-based, including grass seed. It is also characteristic that many of the farms in Kolindsund are livestock-free and solely based on farming of grain crops, not least wheat.

References

Literature

External links
Video about Kolindsund:  Kolindsund - Former Lake/A Drive/Djursland/Denmark

Lakes of Denmark
Former lakes of Europe
1874 establishments in Denmark